Judith Connor (born 18 November 1953) is a retired female tennis player from New Zealand also known by her married name, Judy Connor-Chaloner. She won the 1979 doubles title at the Australian Open, alongside Dianne Evers. It was Connor's first and only career Grand Slam title.

Grand Slam finals

Doubles: 1 (1 title)

References

External links
 
 
 

1953 births
Living people
New Zealand female tennis players
Australian Open (tennis) champions
Grand Slam (tennis) champions in women's doubles
20th-century New Zealand women